Mannus, according to the Roman writer Tacitus, was a figure in the creation myths of the Germanic tribes. Tacitus is the only source of these myths.

Tacitus wrote that Mannus was the son of Tuisto and the progenitor of the three Germanic tribes Ingaevones, Herminones and Istvaeones. In discussing the German tribes Tacitus wrote:

Several authors consider the name Mannus in Tacitus's work to stem from an Indo-European root; see Manu and Yemo#Linguistic evidence

The Latinized name Mannus is evidently of some relation to Proto-Germanic *Mannaz, "man".

Mannus again became popular in literature in the 16th century, after works published by Annius de Viterbo and Johannes Aventinus purported to list him as a primeval king over Germany and Sarmatia.

In the 19th century, F. Nork wrote that the names of the three sons of Mannus can be extrapolated as Ingui, Irmin, and Istaev or Iscio. A few scholars like Ralph T. H. Griffith have expressed a connection between Mannus and the names of other ancient founder-kings, such as Minos of Greek mythology, and Manu of Hindu tradition.

Guido von List incorporated the myth of Mannus and his sons into his occult beliefs which were later adopted into Nazi occult beliefs.

See also
Manu (Hinduism)
Manu and Yemo
Man (word)
Ask and Embla - the first humans in Norse mythology
Mannaz rune
Tvashtar (cf. Tuisto)
Frankish Table of Nations - (Mannus' sons are mentioned)

References

 Grimm, Jacob (1835). Deutsche Mythologie (German Mythology); From English released version Grimm's Teutonic Mythology (1888); Available online by Northvegr © 2004-2007: Chapter 15, page 2  File retrieved 12-08-2011.
 Tacitus. Germania (1st Century AD). (in Latin)

Germanic mythology
Legendary progenitors